George Burba is an American bio-atmospheric scientist, author, and inventor. 

Burba is a Science & Strategy Fellow at LI-COR Biosciences of the Battery Ventures Group, a Global Fellow at Robert B. Daugherty Water for Food Global Institute, and a Graduate Adjunct Professor at the University of Nebraska-Lincoln.

Burba is an experimental researcher, and a leading figure in micrometeorology, surface-to-atmosphere exchange of greenhouse gasses, water vapor, heat and momentum, and the direct real-time measurements of carbon emission and sequestration, evaporation and transpiration, and turbulent transport within the atmospheric boundary layer. He is an author of multiple books on these subjects, used by universities and teaching institutions across the globe, as well as numerous other publications.

Research and career 
Burba is an expert on the in-situ measurement methods: an author of instrument surface heating concept, related equations known as “Burba corrections”, an inventor of two new types of gas analyzers known as “enclosed-path” and “semi-open-path”, a multi-method flux emissions station, and new methods for computing gas fluxes from the open-path high-speed laser-based analyzers, and from the multiple types of low-speed gas analyzers. He is an elected Senior Member of the National Academy of Inventors.

After his PhD, Burba worked as a graduate faculty at the University of Nebraska and as a scientist at the LI-COR Biosciences. In 2016, he was appointed Global Fellow at Robert B. Daugherty Water for Food Global Institute. At LI-COR Biosciences, he was appointed to the position of Science Fellow in 2017, and to the position of Science & Strategy Fellow in 2019. The same year he was elected a Senior Member of the National Academy of Inventors.

Education
Burba was educated at Lomonosov Moscow State University and at the University of Nebraska where he received a PhD in 2005 in Bio-Atmospheric Sciences for the study of water, light and energy transport in the natural and agricultural systems, supervised by Professor Shashi Verma.

Personal life 
George Burba is a son of ru:George A. Burba and a grandson of Aleksandr A. Burba.

References

Living people
Year of birth missing (living people)
University of Nebraska alumni
Moscow State University alumni
Industry and corporate fellows
American technology businesspeople
Atmospheric scientists
Environmental scientists
American scientists
American textbook writers
Science writers
21st-century American inventors